Whisper Me a Lullaby is a 2011 American drama film written by, directed by and starring Christina Vinsick.

Cast
Christina Vinsick as Charlie
Peter Mychalcewycz as Scott
Tika Sumpter as Emma
Jason Downs as Nate
Wyatt Kuether as Levy
John Heard

Production
The film was shot entirely in the Hudson Valley.

Accolade
The film won the "Best Feature Film" award at the Big Apple Film Festival.

References

External links
 

American drama films
2011 drama films
2011 films
Films shot in New York (state)
2010s English-language films
2010s American films